Jose Emidio de Almeida (born 18 November 1979) is a retired Brazilian footballer who played for SHB Đà Nẵng, Navibank Sài Gòn, Quảng Nam in V.League 1.

Honours

Individual
V-League Best player(2): 2007, 2008.
V-League Top scores(2): 2007, 2008

References

1979 births
Living people
Brazilian expatriate footballers
Expatriate footballers in Vietnam
Brazilian expatriate sportspeople in Vietnam
Brazilian footballers
Association football forwards
SHB Da Nang FC players
Navibank Sài Gòn FC players
Quang Nam FC players
Footballers from Curitiba